The Post Office Gallery is an art gallery in Ballarat, Victoria, Australia.

The former Ballarat Post Office is located on the corner of Sturt and Lydiard Streets.  Classified by Heritage Victoria it was built during William Wardell's tenure as Inspector-General and Chief Architect of the Public Works Department. The Ballarat Post Office was the largest of its kind after the Melbourne General Post Office.

In 2002 the Ballarat Post Office became part of the University of Ballarat Arts Academy which includes the Post Office Gallery.

References

External links
 Official PO Gallery website

Buildings and structures in Ballarat
Art museums and galleries in Victoria (Australia)
Ballarat
Federation University Australia
Art museums established in 2002
2002 establishments in Australia